Jeremiah Loo Phay Xing (born 28 September 1997) is a Malaysian artistic gymnast. He represented Malaysia at the 2020 Summer Olympics and finished sixty-second in the all-around during the qualification round.

References

External links 
 

1997 births
Living people
Malaysian male artistic gymnasts
Gymnasts at the 2014 Summer Youth Olympics
Gymnasts at the 2020 Summer Olympics
Olympic gymnasts of Malaysia
Commonwealth Games competitors for Malaysia
Gymnasts at the 2018 Asian Games
Asian Games competitors for Malaysia
Southeast Asian Games medalists in gymnastics
Southeast Asian Games gold medalists for Malaysia
Southeast Asian Games silver medalists for Malaysia
Southeast Asian Games bronze medalists for Malaysia
21st-century Malaysian people